Michael Frederick Billmeyer (born April 24, 1964) is a former baseball player who most recently served as the bullpen coach for the Detroit Tigers during the 2017 season. Mick now retired in Maryland.

Career

Playing career
Billmeyer was drafted by the Baltimore Orioles in the second round of the 1985 Major League Baseball Draft. As a catcher, he played in the Orioles, Texas Rangers, and California Angels organizations.  Billmeyer played nine seasons in the minor leagues, mostly at the Single-A level, and advanced as far as Triple-A.  He did not play in the Major Leagues.  Early in his playing career, Billmeyer went by "Mickey", a shorthand form of his given name of Michael.  Later in his playing career, "Mickey" was shortened further to "Mick".

Coaching career
Billmeyer began a career in coaching after his playing career came to an end.  From 1994–1999 he was the bullpen/workout coordinator for the Angels.  He joined the Phillies organization in 2000, working as a catching coordinator for the organization through the 2003 season.  From 2004–2008 he served as the Phillies Major League catching coach, and then served as the bullpen coach from 2009–2012.  For the 2013 season, Billmeyer returned to the role of major league catching coach.  During his time with the Phillies, Billmeyer served under managers Larry Bowa, Gary Varsho, Charlie Manuel, and Ryne Sandberg.  As the catching coach, he was a member of the 2008 World Series Championship team.

Following the 2013 season, the Phillies announced they would not be renewing Billmeyer's contract.

On November 18, 2013, the Tigers announced the hiring of Billmeyer as their bullpen coach.

References

External links

1964 births
Living people
American expatriate baseball players in Canada
Anaheim Angels coaches
Baseball coaches from Maryland
Baseball players from Maryland
Bluefield Orioles players
California Angels coaches
Charlotte Rangers players
Detroit Tigers coaches
Edmonton Trappers players
Hagerstown Suns players
Major League Baseball bullpen coaches
Miami Marlins (FSL) players
Midland Angels players
NC State Wolfpack baseball players
North Carolina State University alumni
Palm Springs Angels players
People from Washington County, Maryland
Philadelphia Phillies coaches
Quad Cities Angels players
Rochester Aces players